Nassarius coriolis is a species of sea snail, a marine gastropod mollusk in the family Nassariidae, the Nassa mud snails or dog whelks.

Description
The length of the shell attains 28.1 mm.

Distribution
This marine species occurs off the Philippines..

References

Nassariidae
Gastropods described in 2009